Juan Carlos Haedo (born 3 January 1948) is an Argentine former cyclist. He competed at the 1976 Summer Olympics and 1984 Summer Olympics.

References

External links
 

1948 births
Living people
Argentine male cyclists
Olympic cyclists of Argentina
Cyclists at the 1976 Summer Olympics
Cyclists at the 1984 Summer Olympics
Place of birth missing (living people)
Pan American Games medalists in cycling
Pan American Games bronze medalists for Argentina
Cyclists at the 1979 Pan American Games